Atericca is an Afrotropical genus of brush-footed butterflies.

Species
Aterica galene (Brown, 1776)
Aterica rabena Boisduval, 1833

References

Limenitidinae
Nymphalidae genera
Taxa named by Jean Baptiste Boisduval